Park Sung-hoon (born February 18, 1985) is a South Korean actor.

Personal life 
In March 2017, the agency confirmed that Park and Ryu Hyun-kyung are dating. On August 5, 2022, the couple announced their breakup after 6 years of dating.

Filmography

Film

Television series

Web series

Awards and nominations

References

External links

 
 
 

1985 births
Living people
People from Gwacheon
South Korean male television actors
South Korean male film actors
South Korean male stage actors